FX, F-X, F/X, Fx, fx, or variation, may refer to:

People

Arts, entertainment, and media

Effects
Fx, effects, as in:
 Effects unit, Guitar effects
 Sound effects
 Special effects

Music

Groups and labels
 f(x) (group), South Korean girl group
 HfsNegative FX, a hardcore rock band

Other uses in music
 "FX", a song on Vol. 4 (Black Sabbath album)

Television channels
 FX (TV channel) along with its international networks, include:
 FX (Asia), defunct
 FX (Canada)
 FX (Greece)
 FX (India), defunct
 FX (Italian TV channel), defunct
 FX (Latin America)
 FX (Portugal), known as Fox Comedy since 2015
 FX (Australia), defunct
 Fox (UK and Ireland), British television channel formerly known as FX

Other uses in arts, entertainment, and media
 FX (comics), a comic book series
 FX (magazine), a UK trade magazine
 F/X , a 1986 American action-thriller film
 F/X2 , a 1991 action-thriller sequel to the 1986 film
 F/X: The Series, a television program based on the movie

Brands and enterprises
 FX Airguns, Swedish airgun manufacturer
 FX format, Nikon's nomenclature for the full-frame digital SLR camera
 FedEx Express, IATA airline code FX
 Fuji Xerox, or FX, a Japanese document management company

Computing
 AMD FX, AMD's processor
 Athlon 64 FX processor
 Firefox, a web browser
 GeForce FX graphics processing unit
 JavaFX, a software platform
 Super FX, a SNES coprocessor
 fx, a command-line JSON processing tool

Economics and finance
 Foreign exchange (disambiguation)
 Foreign exchange market, forex or FX

Healthcare and science
 Fx, medical shorthand for a bone fracture
 Factor X, a protein involved in coagulation

Vehicles
 Holden 48-215, unofficially FX, Australian car
 Infiniti FX, an SUV
 Tecma FX, a French hang glider
 Toyota Kijang or Tamaraw FX, an SUV

Aviation
 Fighter Experimental:
 FX (Fighter Experimental), specifications for two US Naval fighter projects
 F-X (Fighter, Unknown designation number), ultimately USAF F-15 Eagle and General Dynamics F-16
 KFX/IFX, Indonesian fighter program
 KF-X, South Korean fighter program

Other uses
 f(x), functions in mathematics
 Foreign exchange service (telecommunications), a telephone connection to a distant exchange
 Frequent Express, a transit service provided by TriMet in Portland and Gresham, Oregon

See also